Nizhnyaya Pokrovka is a rural locality (a selo) in Krasnogvardeysky District, Belgorod Oblast, Russia. The population was 582 as of 2010. There are 4 streets.

Geography 
Nizhnyaya Pokrovka is located 21 km northeast of Biryuch (the district's administrative centre) by road. Sorokino is the nearest rural locality.

References 

Rural localities in Krasnogvardeysky District, Belgorod Oblast